The La Caja Formation is a geologic formation in Mexico. It preserves fossils dating from the Kimmeridgian to the lower Berriasian. La Caja Formation is widespread in northeastern and central Mexico and known for their abundant and diverse well-preserved ammonites. It was deposited in hemipelagic conditions, and predominantly consists of siliclastic sediments, including marl, with limestone. It is laterally equivalent to the  La Casita Formation, which represent more proximal facies. The ichthyosaurs Ophthalmosaurus icenicus and Parrassaurus yacahuitztli, metriorhynchid Cricosaurus saltillensis and the  giant pliosaur "Monster of Aramberri" are known from the formation.

See also

 List of fossiliferous stratigraphic units in Mexico

References
Notes

Sources
 

Jurassic Mexico
Jurassic System of North America
Kimmeridgian Stage
Tithonian Stage
Berriasian Stage